Francis or Frank Butler may refer to:

Arts and entertainment
Frank Butler (musician) (1928–1984), American jazz drummer
Frank Butler (writer) (1890–1967), American film writer
Frank E. Butler (1850–1926), Irish-American stage performer and marksman; husband of Annie Oakley

Sports
Francis Butler (cricketer) (1856–1885), Australian cricketer
Frank Butler (American football) (1909–1979), American football offensive lineman in the NFL
Frank Butler (British sportswriter) (1916–2006), British sportswriter and author
Frank Butler (cricketer) (1889–1965), Australian cricketer
Frank Butler (jockey) (1817–1856), English jockey
Frank Butler (outfielder) (1860–1945), American baseball player
Frank Butler (pitcher) (1872–1899), African-American baseball pitcher and outfielder
Frank Butler (water polo) (born 1932), South African Olympic water polo player

Others
Francis Butler (1810–1874), American author and veterinarian
Frank Butler (founder) (1928–2020), American boat designer and manufacturer
Frank Butler (politician) (1884–1961), member of the Queensland Legislative Assembly
Frank B. Butler (1885–1973), Florida businessman and founder of a Florida beach open to Black visitors in the 1920s
Frank Chatterton Butler (fl. 1954–1956), British ambassador to Senegal
Frank Hedges Butler (1855–1928), British wine merchant

See also
Francis Butler Simkins (1897–1966), American historian